Am Olam was a movement among Russian Jews to establish agricultural colonies in America. The name means "Eternal People" and is taken from the title of an essay by Peretz Smolenskin. It was founded in Odessa in 1881 by Mania Bakl (Maria Bahal) and Moses Herder, who called for the creation of Socialist agricultural communities in the United States.

In the 1880s there were 26 colonies promoted in 8 states. Eventually the majority of Am Olam colonies were set up upon a "commercial" rather than communalist basis. The land was owned in common but divided into sections farmed by individuals.

See also
 Kibbutz, a type of cooperative agricultural community created by Zionist Jews in Palestine, later in Israel
 Moshav, a similar type of community, but with less of a collective administration system than the kibbutz
 Roosevelt, New Jersey: Visions of Utopia: 1983 documentary about a 1930s socialist Jewish farming community

References

External links
Farming Communities of New Jersey at the JewishGen KehilaLinks project

Defunct Jewish organizations
Rural community development
Russian-Jewish culture in the United States
Jewish-American history
Jewish agricultural colonies
Jewish movements
Jewish socialism
1881 establishments in the Russian Empire